General Price may refer to:

Cedric Rhys Price (1905–1987), British Army major general
Charles F. B. Price (1881–1954), U.S. Marine Corps lieutenant general
Charles Basil Price (1889–1975), Canadian Army major general
Denis Price (1908–1966), British Army major general
John Price (British Army officer) (died 1747), British Army major general
Lee Price (1970s–2010s), U.S. Army major general
Sterling Price (1809–1867), Confederate States Army major general
Thomas Lawson Price (1809–1870), Missouri Militia brevet major general
William G. Price Jr. (1869–1960), Pennsylvania National Guard major general

See also
Henry ap Rhys Pryce (1874–1950), British Indian Army general
Attorney General Price (disambiguation)